The lex Appuleia agraria was a Roman law introduced by the plebeian tribune Lucius Appuleius Saturninus during his second tribunate in 100 BC. The  law concerned the distribution of land to poor Romans and to Gaius Marius' veterans. According to Appian, this was to be provided from land that had been seized by the Cimbri in northern Italy and according to other ancient writers it was to be achieved by founding new Roman colonies outside Italy (see below).

Saturninus was an ally of Marius. According Pseudo-Aurelius Victor "to win the favour with the soldiers of Marius, [he] carried a law assigning veterans a 100 iugera [125 acres, 311.5 hectares] of land in Africa" during his first tribunate in 103 BC. He helped Marius to be elected to his fourth consulship in 102 BC.

The provisions of the lex Appuleia Agraria
According to Appian, the law  provided for the distribution of land which had been seized by the invading Cimbri in Cisalpine Gaul and who had been defeated by Gaius Marius at the Battle of Vercellae in 101 BC. This was to be allocated to poor citizens, especially Marius' veterans. According to Pseudo-Aurelius Victor, Saturninus sent colonists to the  Roman provinces Sicily, Achaea and Macedonia. Velleius Paterculus stated that the colony of Epodeia was founded in north-western Italy by Marius during his sixth consulship (100 BC). Lucius Annaeus Seneca and Pliny the Elder wrote that Marius founded a colony in Corsica. Pliny added that its name was Mariana.The two writers did not specify when this occurred, but it is likely that this was also a result of the law.

Appian wrote that the law assigned the larger share to the Italian allies. Presumably these were to be mainly allied veterans who had served under Marius.

The law provided that Marius should have authority to make three Roman citizens in every colony.                                        
                                            
Another provision  required that the senators should take an oath to obey the law within five days and anyone who refused to do so should be expelled from the Senate and pay a fine of twenty talents for the benefit of the people.

Political conflict
The provision that the Italian allies were to be assigned the larger share of the land angered Rome's urban poor, who caused a disturbance at the meeting of the assembly which was to vote on the bill in an attempt to prevent the passage of the law. Saturninus had called in people from the rural districts, many of whom were  Marius' veterans, to support him. They dispersed the urban people with clubs. The latter claimed that a thunder was heard during the assembly. According to Roman tradition, this was a bad omen which would require the business of the day to be brought to a close. Saturninus ignored this.

Marius wanted to use the provision regarding the oath against Quintus Caecilius Metellus Numidicus, his enemy. He declared that he would not take the oath. Metellus agreed and the other senators approved. On the fifth day Marius hastily convoked the Senate late in the day.  He claimed that he was afraid of the reaction of the people if they did not take the oath and proposed a stratagem. He said if they took the oath to obey the law insofar at it was a law, the country people would disperse. Afterwards they could show that this law was not really a law because it had been enacted by violence and after thunder had been reported.

While the senators were confused and silent, Marius took quick action before they had time to think. He gave his oath publicly. The other senators followed suit, fearing  for their safety. However, Metellus refused. The next day Apuleius' officers tried to drag him out of the senate-house, but the other tribunes defended him. The country people were brought back into town. They were told that the law would not be executed unless Metellus was banished and that they would not get their land. A banishment decree was proposed. On ratification day the urban people carried knives and escorted Metellus to protect him. Metellus decided to leave the city rather than risk a conflict because of him. Apuleius had the decree ratified.

Later in the same year, Saturninus got into political trouble and was lynched by an angry crowd. The Senate and the people called for the recall of Metellus. Publius Furius, another plebeian  tribune, opposed this. However, he, too, was lynched and Metellus was allowed to return.

See also
Agrarian law
Marian reforms
List of Roman laws
Plebeian tribune
Roman Law

Notes

References
 Primary sources
 Appian,  The Civil Wars, Penguin Classics; New Ed edition, 1996;  
 Aurelius Victor. De Viris Illustribus (Latin,  CreateSpace Independent Publishing Platform, 2014; 
 Lucius Annaeus Seneca, Of a Happy Life (Annotated) (Dialogues of Seneca),Independently published, 2018; 
 the Elder, Natural History,Penguin Classics, Reprint edition,1991; 
 Plutarch, Lives, Volume IX: Demetrius and Antony. Pyrrhus and Gaius Marius, (Loeb Classical Library), Loeb 1989; 

 Secondary sources
 A.H. Beesley, Epochs of Ancient History. The Gracchi, Marius, and Sulla, Leopold Classic Library, 2015; ASIN: B015RINFJM
 Flower H., I., The Cambridge Companion to the Roman Republic (Cambridge Companions to the Ancient World), Cambridge University Press; 2 edition,2014); 
 Hyden. M.,  Gaius Marius: The Rise and Fall of Rome's Saviour, Pen & Sword Military, 2017; 

 Internet resources
 Kim Young-Chae, Roman Agrarian Policies and the Italian Countryside. PhD Thesis, Merton College, University of Oxford, 2016 

Roman law
Reform in the Roman Republic
2nd century BC in the Roman Republic